Roy Kramer Golden (July 12, 1888 – October 4, 1961) was a pitcher in Major League Baseball. He played for the St. Louis Cardinals.

References

External links

1888 births
1961 deaths
Major League Baseball pitchers
St. Louis Cardinals players
Baseball players from Ohio
Richmond Pioneers players
Dayton Veterans players
New Castle Nocks players
Chattanooga Lookouts players